Frank Coffey was an Australian author, cameraman, director and screenwriter who worked mostly on the production of documentaries. For a number of years he was in-house writer for Cinesound Productions.

In the late 1940s he was charge of documentary productions for Movietone.

Select credits
The Hayseeds (1933)
Grandad Rudd (1934)
Strike Me Lucky (1934)
When the Kellys Rode (1934)
Uncivilised (1936) – assistant cameraman
Rangle River (1936) – editor
A Nation is Built (1938) – editor
Gone to the Dogs (1939) – story editor
100,000 Cobbers (1943) – writer

References

External links
Frank Coffey at National Film and Sound Archive

Australian writers